John Thomas (born January 25, 1935) is a former professional American football player who played ten seasons for the San Francisco 49ers in the National Football League.

From Football Card --

 "Didn't make the squad as an offense end in 1957 but returned last year and was a starting tackle most of the season... Excellent pass-blocker and has good speed and agility . . . noted more as a basketball player at Pacific where he won four varsity letters and captained team two years . . . had tryout with St. Louis Hawks  . . . barnstormed last winter with the Harlem Clowns . . . native of Tyler, Tex . . . lives in El Cerrito, Calif, with wife and two children" 

1935 births
Living people
Sportspeople from Tyler, Texas
American football offensive tackles
Pacific Tigers football players
San Francisco 49ers players
Western Conference Pro Bowl players
Players of American football from Texas